Statistics of Dhivehi League in the 2012 season. According to the FAM Calendar 2012, Dhiraagu Dhivehi League will start on April 18 and is set to end on September 27. The winner will qualify for the AFC Cup and 2nd place will qualify for AFC Cup play-offs.

Teams
Club All Youth Linkage
Club Eagles
Club Valencia
Club Vyansa
Maziya S&RC
New Radiant SC
VB Addu FC (name rebranded from VB Sports Club)
Victory Sports Club

Personnel
Note: Flags indicate national team as has been defined under FIFA eligibility rules. Players may hold more than one non-FIFA nationality.

 1 MediaNet on the front right side of the jersey, just opposite to the club logo.
 2 Happy Market sponsor at the back, just below the jersey number. Happy Market sponsored their imported product "Oldenburger Milk".

League table
Format: In Round 1 and Round 2, all eight teams play against each other. Top six teams after Round 2 play against each other in Round 3. Teams with most total points after Round 3 are crowned the Dhivehi League champions and qualified for the AFC Cup. The top four teams qualify for the President's Cup. Bottom two teams after Round 2 play against top two teams of Second Division in Dhivehi League Qualification for places in next year's Dhivehi League.

Standings of round 1

Standings of round 2

Standings of round 3

Final standings

Results

Round 1 results

A total of 28 matches will be played in this round.

Round 2 results

A total of 28 matches will be played in this round.

Round 3 results

A total of 15 matches will be played in this round.

Season statistics

Scorers

Assists

Hat-tricks

 4 Player scored 4 goals

Scoring
First goal of the season: Ashfaq for New Radiant SC against VB Addu FC (18 April 2012)
Fastest goal of the season: 3 minutes 8 seconds – Shamweel for VB Addu FC against Victory Sports Club (1 June 2012)
Largest winning margin: 5 goals
Club All Youth Linkage 0–5 Vyansa (30 May 2012)
Highest scoring game: 9 goals
VB Addu FC 6–3 Club Eagles (18 May 2012)
Most goals scored in a match by a single team: 6 goals
VB Addu FC 6–3 Club Eagles (18 May 2012)
Most goals scored in a match by a losing team: 3 goals
VB Addu FC 6–3 Club Eagles (18 May 2012)

Clean sheets by club
Most clean sheets: 5
New Radiant SC
Fewest clean sheets: 0
Club All Youth Linkage

Clean sheets by goalkeepers
Most clean sheets: 4
Imran Mohamed (New Radiant SC)
Fewest clean sheets: 0
Hussain Habeeb (VB Addu FC)
Ibrahim Siyad (Club All Youth Linkage)
Abdulla Ziyazan (VB Addu FC)
Athif Ahmed (Maziya S&RC)

Discipline
Worst overall disciplinary record (1 pt per yellow card, 2 pts per red card):
 VB Addu FC – 23 points (17 yellow & 3 red card)
Best overall disciplinary record:
 Maziya S&RC – 9 points (7 yellow & 1 red card)
 Vyansa – 9 points (9 yellow cards)
Most yellow cards (club): 17 – VB Addu FC
Most yellow cards (player):
4 – Ali Imran (Club Valencia)
Most red cards (club): 3 – VB Addu FC
Most red cards/suspensions (player):
2 – Sobah Mohamed (VB Addu FC)

Promotion/relegation playoff for 2013 Dhivehi League

Matches

References

 
Dhivehi League seasons
Maldives
Maldives
1